The Company I Keep (subtitled Art Farmer Meets Tom Harrell) is an album by trumpeters Art Farmer and Tom Harrell which was recorded in 1994 and released on the Arabesque label.

Reception

The AllMusic review by  Scott Yanow said "although few fireworks occur (the two brassmen mostly sound pretty complementary and mellow), the music is tasteful, enjoyable advanced hard bop".

Track listing
 "Sunshine in the Rain" (Tom Harrell) – 7:02
 "Song of the Canopy" (Geoff Keezer) – 8:15
 "Santana" (Fritz Pauer) – 10:37
 "Beside Myself" (Harrell) – 5:29
 "Beyond" (Kenny Davis) – 6:01	
 "T.G.T.T. (Too Good to Title)" (Duke Ellington) – 6:58
 "Who Knows" (Davis) – 8:22
 "Turn Out the Stars" (Bill Evans, Gene Lees) – 8:52

Personnel
Art Farmer – flumpet
Tom Harrell – trumpet, flugelhorn, arranger
Ron Blake – tenor saxophone, soprano saxophone
Geoff Keezer – piano, arranger 
Kenny Davis – double bass, arranger
Carl Allen – drums
Fritz Pauer – arranger

References

Arabesque Records albums
Art Farmer albums
1994 albums